The 2012 Eurockey Cup U-15 was the 1st edition of the Eurockey Cup U-15. It was held in November 2012 in Vilanova i la Geltrú, in Spain.

Teams

Group stage

Groupo A

Group B

Group C

Final stage

Championship

9th - 13th place

Final standing

References

External links

International roller hockey competitions hosted by Spain
2013 in Spanish sport
2013 in roller hockey